Chionodes scotodes is a moth in the family Gelechiidae. It is found in Sonora, Mexico.

References

Chionodes
Moths described in 1911
Moths of Central America